is a singer born on January 11, 1980, in Soma, Fukushima Prefecture, Japan. The music video for her song "Kaze no Tōri Michi" aired on the NHK program Minna no Uta and was animated by Tomomi Mochizuki, Katsuya Kondō, and Naoya Tanaka, all three of whom have worked on Studio Ghibli films.

Discography 
Listed in reverse chronological order, with newest at the top.
 Lily Pop Life: Complete Songs (リリーポップライフ~complete songs~), July 12, 2006, independent label
 Kaze no Tōri Michi (カゼノトオリミチ), February 16, 2005, BabeStar/Victor
 Ajisai Hatake (あじさい畑), June 4, 2004, independent label
 Private: The Piano Album (プライベート~The Piano Album~), March 15, 2004, independent label
 A Lily Life (リリーライフ), August 5, 2002, independent label

References

External links 
  Official Site

1980 births
Japanese pianists
Japanese women pianists
Japanese women singer-songwriters
Japanese singer-songwriters
Living people
Musicians from Fukushima Prefecture
21st-century Japanese pianists
21st-century Japanese singers
21st-century Japanese women singers
21st-century women pianists